Luís André Alves Martins (born 1 October 1992 in Santa Maria da Feira) is a Portuguese footballer who plays for U.D. Oliveirense as a defender.

Football career
On 26 July 2014, Martins made his professional debut with Oliveirense in a 2014–15 Taça da Liga match against União Madeira.

References

External links

Stats and profile at LPFP 

1992 births
Living people
Sportspeople from Santa Maria da Feira
Portuguese footballers
Association football defenders
U.D. Oliveirense players